The segmental ganglia (singular: s. ganglion) are ganglia of the annelid and arthropod central nervous system that lie in the segmented ventral nerve cord. The ventral nerve cord itself is a chain of ([Metamerism (biology)|metamerism ganglia, some compressed.

References

Animal nervous system
Arthropod anatomy
Annelid anatomy